Capital punishment is a legal penalty in North Korea. It is used for many offences such as grand theft, murder, rape, drug smuggling, treason, espionage, political dissidence, defection, piracy, consumption of media not approved by the government and proselytizing religious beliefs that contradict practiced Juche ideology. Current working knowledge of the topic depends heavily on verified accounts of defectors (both relatives of victims, and former members of the government). Executions are mostly carried out by a firing squad, hanging or decapitation. Allegedly, executions take place in public, which, if true, makes North Korea one of the last four countries to still perform public executions, the other three being Iran, Saudi Arabia, and Somalia. The most common reason for executions in North Korea is viewing South Korean media.

Reported executions
The South-Korean-based Database Center for North Korean Human Rights has collected unverified testimony on 1,193 historic executions in North Korea to 2009. Amnesty International reported that there were 105 executions between 2007 and 2012. The Foreign Policy periodical estimated there were 60 executions in 2010. In October 2001, the North Korean government told the UN Human Rights Committee that only 13 executions had occurred since 1998 and that no public execution had occurred since 1992.

On November 3, 2013, according to a JoongAng Ilbo report citing an unnamed source "familiar with internal affairs in the North who recently visited the country", at least 80 people were publicly executed for minor offenses. These were said to be carried out simultaneously in Wonsan, Chongjin, Sariwon, Pyongsong and three other North Korean cities for crimes such as watching South Korean movies, distributing, watching and/or possessing pornography or possessing a Bible. The source said that according to witnesses from Wonsan, 10,000 residents were forced to watch when eight people were machine-gunned to death at the local Shinpoong stadium.

On December 13, 2013, North Korean state media announced the execution of Jang Sung-taek, the uncle by marriage of North Korea's leader Kim Jong-un. The South Korean National Intelligence Service believes that two of his closest aides, Lee Yong-ha and Jang Soo-keel, were executed in mid-November. According to unnamed sources cited by a South Korean newspaper, Jang's nephew, O Sang-hon, was executed by being burnt alive with a flame thrower.

In 2014, the United Nations Human Rights Council created a Commission of inquiry on human rights in the DPRK, investigating and documenting alleged instances of executions carried out with or without trial, publicly or secretly, in response to political and other crimes that are often not among the most serious. The Commission determined that these systematic acts, if true, rise to the level of crimes against humanity.

List of reported executions

Public executions
North Korea was alleged to have resumed public executions in October 2007 after they had declined in the years following 2000 amidst international criticism. Prominent supposedly executed criminals include officials convicted of drug trafficking and embezzlement. Common criminals convicted of crimes such as murder, robbery, rape, drug dealing, smuggling, piracy, vandalism, etc. have also been reported to be executed, mostly by firing squad. The country does not publicly release national crime statistics or reports on the levels of crimes. , North Korea is allegedly one of four countries carrying out executions in public, the other three being Iran, Saudi Arabia and Somalia. However, according to defectors interviewed by The Diplomat in 2014, the practice of such activities had not occurred, at least in Hyesan since 2000.

In October 2007, a South Pyongan province factory chief convicted of making international phone calls from 13 phones he installed in his factory basement was supposedly executed by firing squad in front of a crowd of 150,000 people in a stadium, according to an unverified report from a South Korean aid agency called Good Friends. Good Friends also reported that six were killed in the rush as spectators left. In another unverified instance, 15 people were allegedly publicly executed for crossing the border into China.

A U.N. General Assembly committee has adopted a draft resolution, co-sponsored by more than 50 countries, expressing "very serious concern" at reports of widespread human rights violations in North Korea, including public executions. North Korea has condemned the draft, saying it is inaccurate and biased. The report was sent to the then 192-member General Assembly for a final vote.

In 2011, two people were allegedly executed in front of 500 spectators for handling propaganda leaflets floated across the border from South Korea, reportedly as part of an unverified campaign by former North Korean leader Kim Jong-il to tighten ideological control as he groomed his youngest son, Kim Jong-un, as the eventual successor.

On November 3, 2013, 80 North Koreans were publicly executed across North Korea.

In June 2019, a South Korean NGO the Transitional Justice Working Group released an unverified report “Mapping the Fate of the Dead” that suggested 318 sites in North Korea supposedly used by the government for public executions. According to the NGO, public executions have taken place near rivers, fields, markets, schools, and sports grounds. The report alleges that family members and children of those sentenced to death were forced to watch their executions.

Capital punishment in prison camps
Amnesty International has alleged that torture and executions are widespread in political prisons in North Korea. Unverified testimonies describe secret and public executions in North Korean prisons by firing squad, decapitation or by hanging. Executions are allegedly used as a means of deterrence, often accompanied by torture.

See also

 Human rights in North Korea
 Prisons in North Korea
 Persecution of Christians in North Korea

Notes

External links
North Korea  on the Death Penalty Worldwide database
 

 
North Korea
Penal system in North Korea
Death in North Korea
Human rights abuses in North Korea